Horst Trimhold (4 February 1941 – 8 April 2021) was a German footballer who played as a midfielder.

Club career 
He spent eight seasons in the Bundesliga with Eintracht Frankfurt and Borussia Dortmund.

International career 
Trimhold represented the West German national team once, in a friendly against Yugoslavia in 1962.

Honours
 DFB-Pokal: 1958–59; runner-up 1963–64

References

External links
 
 
 
 

1941 births
2021 deaths
People from the Rhine Province
Footballers from Essen
German footballers
Association football midfielders
Germany international footballers
Schwarz-Weiß Essen players
Eintracht Frankfurt players
Borussia Dortmund players
FSV Frankfurt players
Bundesliga players